Abdullah Al-Qahtani (born 31 January 1999) is a Saudi Arabian professional footballer who plays as a winger for Al-Faisaly.

Career
Al-Qahtani began his career at the youth teams of Abha. He made his debut for the first team during the 2017–18 season, where he helped them earn promotion to the First Division. On 31 January 2019, Al-Qahatani signed a five-year contract with Al-Faisaly. After making no appearances for Al-Faisaly, Al-Qahtani returned to Abha on loan from Al-Faisaly on 2 January 2020. On 27 January 2021, Al-Qahtani joined Abha on loan once again. On 31 August 2021, Al-Qahtani joined Abha on loan until the end of the season for the third time.

References

External links
 
 

Living people
1999 births
Association football wingers
Saudi Arabian footballers
Saudi Arabia youth international footballers
Abha Club players
Al-Faisaly FC players
Saudi Second Division players
Saudi First Division League players
Saudi Professional League players